2708 Burns is a carbonaceous Themistian asteroid from the outer regions of the asteroid belt, approximately  in diameter. It was discovered on 24 November 1981, by American astronomer Edward Bowell at the Anderson Mesa Station near Flagstaff, Arizona, in the United States. It was named after American planetary scientist Joseph A. Burns. The likely elongated B-type asteroid has a rotation period of 5.3 hours.

Orbit and classification 

Burns is a Themistian asteroid that belongs to the Themis family, a very large family of carbonaceous asteroids, named after 24 Themis. It orbits the Sun in the outer main-belt at a distance of 2.5–3.6 AU once every 5 years and 5 months (1,975 days; semi-major axis of 3.08 AU). Its orbit has an eccentricity of 0.18 and an inclination of 3° with respect to the ecliptic.

The body's observation arc begins with a precovery taken at Goethe Link Observatory in February 1950, more than 31 years prior to its official discovery observation at Anderson Mesa.

Naming 

This minor planet was named after Joseph A. Burns (born 1941), American planetary scientist and astronomer at Cornell University in New York, and a co-discoverer of the trans-Neptunian object  at Palomar in 1997. The official naming citation was published by the Minor Planet Center on 4 August 1982.

Physical characteristics 

In the SMASS classification, Burns is a carbonaceous B-type, which are somewhat brighter than the common C-type asteroids.

Rotation period 

In March 2010, a rotational lightcurve of Burns was obtained from photometric observations by French amateur astronomer René Roy. Lightcurve analysis gave a well-defined rotation period of 5.315 hours with a brightness amplitude of 0.52 magnitude, indicative for a non-spherical shape.

Diameter and albedo 

According to the survey carried out by the NEOWISE mission of NASA's Wide-field Infrared Survey Explorer, Burns measures between 13.63 and 22 kilometers in diameter and its surface has an albedo between 0.051 and 0.12. The Collaborative Asteroid Lightcurve Link assumes an albedo of 0.08 and calculates a diameter of 17.86 kilometers based on an absolute magnitude of 12.1.

References

External links 
 Lightcurve Database Query (LCDB), at www.minorplanet.info
 Dictionary of Minor Planet Names, Google books
 Asteroids and comets rotation curves, CdR – Geneva Observatory, Raoul Behrend
 Discovery Circumstances: Numbered Minor Planets (1)-(5000) – Minor Planet Center
 
 

002708
Discoveries by Edward L. G. Bowell
Named minor planets
002708
19811124